The Caproni Ca.25 was a single-engine monoplane made by the Italian company Aeronautica Caproni in 1914.

Design
The Ca.25 was similar to the Caproni Ca.22 in being of high-wing parasol design, but differed in the installation of the autoresistance system.

Despite the very modest flight characteristics of a single copy of the aircraft was purchased by the military and was used for test flights.

Specifications

References

External links
 

Ca.025
1910s Italian experimental aircraft
Military aircraft of World War I
Shoulder-wing aircraft
Single-engined tractor aircraft
Aircraft first flown in 1914